Hajj Khadijeh (also Romanized as Ḩājj Khadījeh) is a village in Koregah-e Gharbi Rural District, in the Central District of Khorramabad County, Lorestan Province, Iran. At the 2006 census, its population was 249, in 47 families.

References 

Towns and villages in Khorramabad County